Hermann Lux (20 September 1893 – 3 January 1962) was a German footballer.

Lux won three caps for the Germany national football team during his playing career. He later went on to become manager at Tennis Borussia Berlin.

References

External links 
 
 

1893 births
1962 deaths
German footballers
Footballers from Berlin
Germany international footballers
Association football defenders
1. FC Union Berlin players
Tennis Borussia Berlin players
German football managers
Tennis Borussia Berlin managers
20th-century German people